Risin' is Natalia's fifth single that has been written by Janice Robinson and Portia Neeley Rolle. It was released in Belgium as the first single of her second album Back For More on August 9, 2004. On October 3, 2005 it was released in the Netherlands.
The clip shows the concert of Natalia during Marktrock 2004, a large festival in Belgium, and some backstage scenes.
Risin' became a huge hit immediately. It won the "Tien Om Te Zien summer trophy", a music show, after being released 2 weeks. Natalia's previous single "I Want You Back" (which was released in May 2004) ended up second in the contest.

Charts

Music video

We see Natalia performing on the mainstage of Marktrock in Leuven and in the backstage preparing and give signatures to fans.

2004 singles
Natalia (Belgian singer) songs
Songs written by Janice Robinson
2004 songs
Sony BMG singles